The Ucheldre Centre is an arts centre located in Holyhead, Anglesey, Wales.

Architecture
Formerly, it was the chapel building of Holyhead's Bon Sauveur order of nuns convent. The main hall of the Centre, with its imposing height and arched roof, was designed by Professor R M Butler, of Dublin, a leading architect of his day, responsible for many public buildings in Ireland. The building is in a modernized Romanesque style, with a tall square tower, making great use of green local stone. It was saved from demolition in 1988 by a group of local residents to be used in its current guise.

Community Centre
The Ucheldre Centre is a community effort to provide those who live in and visit Holyhead, and nearby parts of north-west Wales, with a centre for arts events, exhibitions, and other community activities of an educational and cultural kind. Before its inauguration, Holyhead had no venue for such events. As a performance space, it seats up to 200. Extensions have been added at the back and sides, to provide room for a gallery, restaurant, and other facilities. The grounds have been landscaped, and contain an amphitheatre for theatrical events, and sculptures by local artists. The main hall also doubles up as a cinema, showing mainstream and less well-known films, on the Centre's film nights.

Famous Visitors
The Centre has regular exhibitions that have included art by such artists as Kyffin Williams. It has also received the Prince of Wales Award, amongst other honours.

External links
Official site
Ucheldre Repertory Company
List of events in the Centre

Arts centres in Wales
Tourist attractions in Anglesey
Holyhead
Performing arts centres in Wales